Monochamus karlitzingeri is a species of beetle in the family Cerambycidae. It was described by Tavakilian and Jiroux in 2015. It is known from China.

References

karlitzingeri
Beetles described in 2015